Unreal Tournament 3 (UT3) is a first-person arena shooter video game developed by Epic Games and published by Midway Games. Part of the Unreal franchise, it is the fourth game in the Unreal Tournament series, and the eighth game overall; its name is in reflection of the game being the first in the franchise to use Unreal Engine 3. It was released on November 19, 2007, for Microsoft Windows, December 10 for the PlayStation 3, and on July 3, 2008, for the Xbox 360. OS X and Linux ports were planned, but they were eventually cancelled. A free-to-play version, entitled Unreal Tournament 3 X, would be self-published by Epic Games, and will be released in 2023.

Similar to its predecessors,  Unreal Tournament 3 is primarily an online multiplayer title. There are eight modes, including Deathmatch, Capture the Flag, as well as modes like Duel, Warfare, Betrayal and Greed. In vehicle maps, the player is equipped with a hover board, which allows players to quickly traverse large maps and grapple onto other teammates' vehicles. The game's single-player campaign does not follow a plot based around the eponymous tournament, but rather a Necris attack that occurs on a colony on an unknown planet, releasing armed Kralls, a warlike race of aliens, on the humans.

The game received positive reviews from critics, and sold more than 1 million copies worldwide.

Gameplay
Similar to the prior entries of the series, the game is primarily an online multiplayer title offering several game modes, including large-scale Warfare, Capture the Flag, and Deathmatch. It also includes an extensive offline multiplayer game with an in-depth story, beginning with a simple tournament ladder and including team members with unique personalities. The following game modes are included:
 Deathmatch
 Team Deathmatch
 Capture the Flag
 Duel – A one versus one game mode. It uses a queuing system: the winner stays, and the loser goes back to the end of the queue. A typical match lasts fifteen minutes with the winner being the player with the most kills.
 Warfare – A mix of Onslaught and Assault game modes. While basic game rules are equal to those of Onslaught, Warfare adds countdown nodes (which, after being captured and defended for a certain period of time, create a vehicle or trigger an event helpful to the capturing team) as well as the orb, which can be used to instantly capture and defend nodes.
 Vehicle Capture the Flag – Capture the Flag, with vehicles as part of the map; this game mode is distinct from the standard Capture the Flag mode. Also, players are given a hoverboard rather than a translocator.
 Betrayal – This game type places freelance players on teams, and when the members of each team kill enemies, the pot for that team grows. Anybody on a team with a pot can betray the rest of the team by shooting them, thus taking the pot, but they must defend themselves from the betrayed teammates for 30 seconds after that, or the teammates receive extra points.
 Greed – Greed is a game that (like the UT2004 mod of the same name) focuses on collecting skulls dropped from dead players and capturing them in the opposing team's base. For Greed, the game uses all Capture the Flag and Vehicle Capture the Flag maps.

Modes not returning from the prior Unreal Tournament games include Invasion, Mutant (having been later on partially replaced by the Titan mutator in the UT3 Titan Pack), Onslaught (replaced by Warfare), Bombing Run, Last Man Standing, Domination, and Double Domination. Assault was removed from the game during production.

In this installment of Unreal Tournament, the vehicles are split into two factions, the Axon vehicles and Necris vehicles. The Axon vehicles are the same vehicles from Unreal Tournament 2004, but several have significant game play changes. In addition, on vehicle maps every player is equipped with a personal hover board, a skateboard-like device that allows players to quickly traverse large maps and grapple onto other teammates' vehicles. The hover board is very vulnerable to attack, and any hit will knock the player off the board and disable him or her for several seconds, leaving the player exposed and vulnerable. The player cannot use any weapons while on the board.

Plot
Unlike the prior Unreal Tournament games, the single-player campaign does not follow a plot based around the Tournament Grand Championship, and therefore several of the teams within Unreal Tournament 3 are not Tournament competitors. The five playable factions are: Iron Guard, a team of human mercenaries led by former Tournament champion Malcolm; the Ronin, a band of four survivors of a Skaarj attack on a human colony; Liandri studius, a series of advanced humanoid robots custom-built or retrofitted for combat; the Krall, a warlike race of aliens formerly under the leadership of the Skaarj, returning from their initial appearance in the original Unreal; and the Necris, warriors who have undergone the process of the same name, making them stronger at the expense of replacing their biological processes with "Nanoblack", effectively turning them into undead soldiers (hence the name, Necris). In the Campaign, players control members of the Ronin, and the Necris serve as the chief antagonists.

In the game's story a Necris attack occurs on a colony on unknown planet, releasing armed Krall on the humans. The colony is defenseless, but a group of Ronins arrives on the scene, defending the survivors. Reaper, the group's leader, advises his second-in-command warrior Othello and his sister Jester to destroy the orbital Necris blockade with a fighter, and orders team's sniper expert, Bishop, to provide cover as he swarms to save the colony. Suddenly, he is caught in the explosion of an incoming rocket missile and passes out, but not before seeing an unknown Necris woman shooting a soldier next to him. Reaper is rescued by Othello and Jester and wakes up in the base of the Izanagi, a guerrilla force that fights against Necris and Axon, and he meets with the leader, revealed to be Malcolm, who also leads the Iron Guard as the Izanagi's army. He explains that the Necris attack was masterminded by Liandri, who also turn some of the Krall, into Necris, controlled undead soldiers. The unknown woman who Reaper saw turns out to be Akasha, the Necris operative who destroyed the colony and also leads mea the Necris forces. Reaper wants to kill her, but Malcolm tells him that he needs to prove himself first.

Development and release
The game was announced on May 9, 2005, as Unreal Tournament 2007 for a 2006 release. In August 2006, the game was delayed until the first half of 2007. The game was renamed to Unreal Tournament 3. The original Unreal Tournament uses the first Unreal Engine, while UT2003 and UT2004 use Unreal Engine 2. Since 2004 incorporates all of the content from 2003, they are regarded as part of the same generation. UT3 is the third generation, as it runs on Unreal Engine 3 and does not reuse any content. The game also uses motion blur effects.

Windows version
A limited collector's edition of the game features an exclusive collector's edition tin and a hardcover art book. A bonus DVD is also included, featuring more than twenty hours of Unreal Engine 3 tool kit video tutorials, the history of the Unreal Tournament series, and behind-the-scenes footage of the making of Unreal Tournament 3. The Limited Collector's Edition was sold in the United States, Canada, Latin America, Europe, South Africa, Australia and most other territories.

PlayStation 3 version
The PlayStation 3 version supports community-made mods that can be uploaded and downloaded to the PS3's HDD or external media, as well as mouse and keyboard inputs. The 1.1 patch was released on March 21, 2008. It adds the ability for players using the North American and European versions to play together, fixes problems with some USB headsets, and displays the lowest pinging servers at the top of the server list. Some updates are only applied on the North American version, since the PAL version released in March 2008 was already partially updated. The 2.0 patch was released on March 5, 2009, and adds better PC mod support, split screen, smarter AI, forty-eight obtainable Trophies, server-side improvements, an improved map vote, local multiplayer, and a new user interface. Online and LAN multiplayer for this version was terminated in July 2014, following the shutdown of all GameSpy servers.

Xbox 360 version
Upon release, the Xbox 360 version had five exclusive maps, two exclusive characters, a two-player split screen mode, and all the downloadable content released by Epic already on the disc. With the release of the PS3 and PC "Titan Upgrade" patch on March 5, these versions offered the formerly exclusive Xbox 360 content, as well as other content. The Xbox 360 version does not support user-generated mods, as additional content has to be verified by Microsoft before being released. It is the only version to support controllers only.

Cancelled Linux and Mac OS X versions
The Linux and Mac OS X versions of the game were planned to be released as downloadable installers that work with the retail disc. Ryan C. Gordon has uploaded screenshots of the game, dating from September 2008, running on both platforms. On May 22, 2009, Ryan stated that the UT3 port for Linux was still in process, but later in December 2010, Steve Polge announced that the Linux port would never be released, making it the second' 'Unreal Tournament game not to be released on Linux.

SoundtrackUnreal Tournament 3: The Soundtrack is primarily based on the original Unreal Tournament score, which was composed by Straylight Productions and Michiel van den Bos. Jesper Kyd and Rom Di Prisco remixed many of UT99's tracks and composed several other original tracks, which were released on November 20, 2007, by Sumthing Else. Sandhya Sanjana was featured as a guest vocalist. Kevin Riepl did also contribute in music production for the game, scoring the cutscenes as well as a few in-game music tracks.

Titan Pack and Black Edition
A free update titled Titan Pack was released for the PC in March 2009; the PS3 version of the pack was released on March 19. The pack includes five maps and two characters that were formerly exclusive to the Xbox 360 version, along with eleven brand-new maps, two new game modes ("Greed" and "Betrayal"), and the Titan Mutator. The Titan Mutator causes a player to grow in size as they do better, while carrying alternative weapons and power-ups. The expansion also includes a new power-up, a new vehicle, two new deployables, and the addition of stinger turrets. A new patch was also released in conjunction with the Titan Pack, which allowed for various AI improvements (especially in vehicle modes), networking performance upgrades and added support for Steam Achievements (PC) and Trophies (PS3). It also adds a two-player split screen mode (formerly exclusive to the 360 version) and mod browsing for the PS3 version.

The Black Edition is a complete Unreal Tournament 3 package—included is the complete UT3 (with patch 2.0) as well as the Titan Pack. The Titan Pack gives players a substantial amount of enhanced features and new content, including many original environments, new gametypes, the namesake Titan mutator, powerful deployables and weapons, new characters, and the Stealthbender vehicle.

Unreal Tournament 3 X
On December 14, 2022, Epic Games announced that the game's online servers for the Windows version would shutdown on January 24, 2023, in order to focus on supporting the Epic Online Services. On that same day, a free-to-play version, entitled Unreal Tournament 3 X, was leaked on Steam, meaning that the game will be using the Epic Online Services and full cross-play between Steam, GOG.com, and the Epic Games Store, with the latter platform being added when it releases. Epic Games will self-publish this version, and will be slated for a 2023 release.

ReceptionUnreal Tournament 3 received positive reviews from critics. Xbox Magazine rated it 8.5 out of 10. PlayStation: the Official Magazine gave it 5 stars out of 5 in its February 2008 issue and stated, "UT3 looks great, but it's every bit the stunner under the surface". In March 2008, Midway announced that UT3'' had sold over a million copies worldwide.

References

External links

2007 video games
2008 video games
Cancelled macOS games
Cancelled Linux games
Epic Games games
Esports games
First-person shooters
Arena shooters
Multiplayer and single-player video games
Multiplayer online games
PlayStation 3 games
Split-screen multiplayer games
Unreal (video game series)
Unreal Engine games
Video game sequels
Video games about death games
Video games scored by Jesper Kyd
Video games scored by Rom Di Prisco
Video games developed in the United States
Video games set in the 24th century
Video games about revenge
Video games using PhysX
Video games with expansion packs
Video games with user-generated gameplay content
Windows games
Xbox 360 games